This is a partial list of molecules that contain 20 carbon atoms.

See also
 Carbon number
 List of compounds with carbon number 19
 List of compounds with carbon number 21

References

C20